This page details the process of qualifying for the 1965 African Cup of Nations.

Qualified teams
The qualified teams are:

Group stage

Zone 1
Originally, Egypt qualified by default after Morocco and Nigeria both withdrew, but Egypt later withdrew due to the deterioration of diplomatic relations with Tunisia following a speech in Jericho by Tunisian President Habib Bourguiba, who called on the Arab countries to recognize Israel.

Zone 2
The match in Nairobi between Kenya and Ethiopia originally ended with Kenya winning 3–2, but Ethiopia lodged a protest with the Confederation of African Football (CAF) claiming Kenya had fielded two players (Moses Wabwayi and Stephen Baraza) who were ineligible as they had represented Uganda previously: the protest was upheld and Ethiopia were awarded a 2–0 victory, subsequently qualifying ahead of Sudan. CAF also suspended both players for one year (backdated to September 1964) after upholding a protest from Uganda that they were still registered with the Uganda F.A. and had not received official transfers.

Kenya argued against the ruling and sent documents to prove that the two were Kenyan citizens, having been born in Kenya, while the case was also referred to FIFA.

Zone 3

Zone 4

Egypt's withdrawal
Following Egypt's withdrawal, CAF announced a playoff between the second-placed teams in the other three Zones to determine Egypt's replacement in the final tournament.

Following this announcement, Sudan declined CAF's invitation to participate, with a single playoff match being scheduled in Accra on 31 October between Congo-Léopoldville and Guinea.

However, Guinea withdrew shortly before this date; therefore, the playoff was scratched and  Congo-Léopoldville qualified.

References

External links
 African Nations Cup 1965

Africa Cup of Nations qualification
Qualification